The 2012 Auto-G Danish Thundersport Championship season was the first season of the Danish Thundersport Championship, it began at Jyllandsringen in May and concluded at the same venue in September. 

The championship succeeded the Danish Touringcar Championship, with the Super 2000 cars being replaced with the Camaro Cup/Trans Am cars.

Jan Magnussen won the championship, driving for Fukamuni Racing.

Teams and drivers
All teams ran the Chevrolet Camaro.

Drivers with an asterisk on their "Rounds" column took part in the non-championship round held at the Copenhagen Historic Grand Prix.

Calendar
All rounds was held in Denmark.

Results

Championship standings

Points are awarded to the top 15 classified finishers in each race. No points are awarded for pole position or fastest lap.

Drivers' standings

Notes:
† — Driver retired, but was classified as they completed 90% of the race distance.
‡ — No points are awarded for the non-championship round held at the Copenhagen Historic Grand Prix.

Notes

References

External links
 

Danish Thundersport Championship